Children of Destiny  is a 1920 American silent film drama directed by George Irving and starring Edith Hallor and Emory Johnson.

Cast
{| 
! style="width: 180px; text-align: left;" |  Actor
! style="width: 230px; text-align: left;" |  Role
|- style="text-align: left;"
|Edith Hallor||Isabelle Hamlin / Rose Hamlin
|-
|William Courtleigh Jr||Richard Hamlin
|-
|Arthur Edmund Carewe||Count Di Varesi
|-
|Emory Johnson||Edwin Ford
|-
|Frederick Garvin||Larry Steers
|-
|}

References

External links

American silent feature films
American black-and-white films
Silent American drama films
Associated Exhibitors films
Films directed by George Irving
1920s English-language films
1920s American films